This is a list of movie theatres that have existed in the Ottawa & Gatineau, Canada region.

Current cinemas

Defunct

See also

List of cinemas in Toronto

References

Bibliography

External links
Cinema Treasures.org

 
 
 
 
 
Lists of cinemas
 
Cinemas
Canadian film-related lists
Cinemas in Ottawa